Glenn Summerville (born 24 October 1973 in Hellevoetsluis) is a Dutch footballer who played for Eerste Divisie club FC Dordrecht during the 1995-2001 football seasons.

References

External links
voetbal international profile

Dutch footballers
People from Hellevoetsluis
FC Dordrecht players
Eerste Divisie players
1973 births
Living people
Association footballers not categorized by position
Footballers from South Holland